At Midnight is a 1913 American silent short film written by Gordon V. May starring Harry Van Meter, Violet Neitz, Louise Lester, Jack Richardson and Vivian Rich. In 2015, George Moore Films produced a feature-length remake of the film.

References

External links

1913 films
American silent short films
American black-and-white films
Films directed by Lorimer Johnston
1910s American films